The 2008 Shelbourne Irish Open was a men's tennis tournament played on outdoor carpet courts. It was the 3rd and final edition of the event, and part of the 2008 ATP Challenger Series of the 2008 ATP Tour. It took place at the tennis courts at the Fitzwilliam Lawn Tennis Club in Dublin, Ireland, from 30 June through 5 July 2008.

Points and prize money

Point distribution

Prize money

* per team

Singles main draw entrants

Seeds

Other entrants
The following players received wildcards into the singles main draw:
  James Cluskey
  Eoin Heavey
  Tristan Farron-Mahon
  Colin O'Brien

The following players received entry from the qualifying draw:
  Richard Bloomfield
  Tomáš Cakl
  Ivo Klec
  Michel Koning

Doubles main draw entrants

Seeds

Other entrants
The following pairs received wildcards into the doubles main draw:
  Tristan Farron-Mahon /  Barry King
  Daniel Glancy /  Michael Hayes
  Eoin Heavey /  James McGee

Champions

Singles

  Robert Smeets defeated  Frederik Nielsen, 7–6(7–5), 6–2

Doubles

  Prakash Amritraj /  Aisam-ul-Haq Qureshi defeated  Jonathan Marray /  Frederik Nielsen, 6–3, 7–6(8–6)

References

External links
Official Results Archive (ATP)

 Singles Draw (ATP)

 Doubles Draw (ATP)

Irish Open